The San Pasqual Stakes is an American Thoroughbred horse race run annually during February at Santa Anita Park in Arcadia, California. The Grade II event is open to horses, age four and up, willing to race one and one-eighth miles (9 furlongs) on dirt and currently offers a purse of $200,000. Since 2011, it is run under allowance weight conditions but was previously run as a handicap.

Inaugurated in 1935, the San Pasqual Handicap was a race limited to three-year-olds until 1939 when it was changed to its present condition. Since inception, it has been contested at various distances:
 6 furlongs : 1935–1936
 7 furlongs : 1938
  miles (8.5 furlongs) : 1937, 1942–1954, 1956–2017
  miles (9 furlongs) : 1939–1941, 2018–present
  miles (10 furlongs) : 1955 (on turf)

Records
Speed record: 
 1:46.95 – Battle of Midway (2019) – at distance of  miles
 1:39.58 – Zappa (2008) – at distance of  miles

Most wins:
 2 – Moonrush (1951, 1953)
 2 – Olden Times (1963, 1964)
 2 – Kings Favor (1968, 1969)
 2 – Express Train (2021,2022) 

Most wins by a jockey:
 8 – Bill Shoemaker (1955, 1959, 1963, 1964, 1965, 1967, 1971, 1974)

Most wins by a trainer:
 5 – Bob Baffert (1999, 2002, 2003, 2013, 2015)

Most wins by an owner:
 3 – Rex C. Ellsworth (1963, 1964, 1965)
 3 – C R K Stable (2020,2021,2022)

Winners

References

 The 2009 San Pasqual Handicap at the NTRA

Horse races in California
Santa Anita Park
Graded stakes races in the United States
Flat horse races for four-year-olds
Recurring sporting events established in 1935